Pierre of the Plains may refer to:
 Pierre of the Plains (1942 film), a Northern film
 Pierre of the Plains (1914 film), a film based on the novel Pierre and his People by Gilbert Parker